The Sydney Camera Circle was a Pictorialist photographic society formed in 1916 in Sydney, Australia. It was most active before World War II, and was influential on Australian photography for fifty years.

History

The Sydney Camera Circle was formed on 28 November 1916 at the Bostock-Little Studio, Phillip Street, Sydney. The founders were Cecil Bostock, Harold Cazneaux, Malcolm McKinnon, James Paton, James S. Stening and William Stewart White. All six signed a manifesto, pledging to advance and promote a Pictorialist photography devoted to Australian sunlight and shadow as opposed to the greys and ‘dismal’ shadows of European styles. In this ambition they shared the ideals of the Heidelberg School of Australian painters. The group was dominated by amateurs interested in photography as an art form who shared constructive criticism and support at their meetings, exhibiting their work under the name of The Sydney Camera Circle.

The group continued as an entity until 1978 when membership was dwindling in competition with that of the Australian Photographic Society and the Camera Club of Sydney.

Membership

Dates show period of membership:

Selected exhibitions

 14 to 28 February 1921: at the invitation of Henri Mallard, 115 prints were displayed at the Kodak Salon, Sydney with sales totaling £70.
 February 1921: Scottish Photographic Federation Salon, Dundee included 60 prints from The Sydney Camera Circle.
 July 1921: London Salon shows 9 prints by 8 members of the Circle.
 October 1921:  Melbourne Arts and Crafts exhibition shows 50 photographs by the members. Kodak Melbourne shows the work in their windows.
 1922: Colonial Competition 1922. Sydney Camera Circle takes first place with medals awarded to Henri Mallard and Florence Milson by the Amateur Photographer and Photography.
 12 June to 8 July 1979: Art Gallery of New South Wales 'Australian Pictorial Photography', S.H. Ervin Gallery, Sydney.
 14 January to 1 April 1984 Art Gallery of NSW 'The Sydney Camera Circle: The Early Years, 1916 – 1938'.

References

External links
 A history of The Sydney Camera Circle

Australian photography organisations
Australian photographers
Pictorialism
History of photography
Organisations based in Sydney
Arts organizations established in 1916
1916 establishments in Australia